Theobald I (died 936) was the Duke of Spoleto from 928 to his death. He was the son of Boniface II, former duke, and member of the line of the Hucpoldings, a house of Frankish Ripuarian origin that built its fortunes in Italy since the 9th century. Theobald was an unscrupulous prince, even for his age, and his career is one of constantly changing alliances as the political winds of central and southern Italy changed direction.

In 929, Theobald joined Landulf I of Benevento and Guaimar II of Salerno in a series of joint attacks against Byzantine Campania, Apulia, and Calabria. Theobald was detrimental to the others' cooperation and all three were unsuccessful and Guaimar returned to his earlier Greek allegiance.

Theobald also allied with Docibilis II of Gaeta against the Greeks.

936 deaths
10th-century dukes of Spoleto
Year of birth unknown